Chamber Symphony may refer to:

Compositions
Chamber Symphony (Adams)
Chamber Symphony (Enescu)
Chamber Symphony (Popov)
Chamber Symphony (Shostakovich)
Chamber Symphony No. 1 (Schoenberg)
Chamber Symphony No. 2 (Schoenberg)
Chamber Symphony (Franz Schreker) 
Little Symphony No. 1 (Milhaud)
Little Symphony No. 2 (Milhaud)
Little Symphony No. 3 (Milhaud)
Little Symphony No. 4 (Milhaud)
Little Symphony No. 5 (Milhaud)
Little Symphony No. 6 (Milhaud)
Chamber Symphony (Zwilich)

Orchestras
Aspen Chamber Symphony
California Chamber Symphony
Cleveland Chamber Symphony
Dallas Chamber Symphony
New York Chamber Symphony
Park Avenue Chamber Symphony
Washington Chamber Symphony